The House on the Moon (German: Das Haus zum Mond) is a 1921 German silent science fiction film directed by Karlheinz Martin and starring Leontine Kühnberg, Erich Pabst and Fritz Kortner. Shot at the Johannisthal Studios in an expressionist style, it is now considered a lost film.

The film's sets were designed by the art director Robert Neppach.

Cast
 Leontine Kühnberg as Bettina - seine Frau / Luna - seine Tochter 
 Erich Pabst as Nathanael - Astronom 
 Fritz Kortner as Jan van Haag - Wachsfigurenhändler 
 Paul Graetz as Kornill - Schauspieler 
 Hans Schweikart as Fabian - sein Sohn 
 Käthe Burga as Pirzel - Kellnerin 
 Max Gülstorff as Just - Actuarius 
 Frida Richard as Julchen - seine Frau 
 Annemarie Mörike as Minchen - seine Tochter 
 Leopold von Ledebur as Peter Pol - Kohlenhändler 
 Sophie Pagay as Babett - seine Frau 
 Gustav von Wangenheim as Andreas, sein Sohn 
 Hugo Döblin as Schlinge - Gerichtsvollzieher 
 Max Adalbert
 Hans Heinrich von Twardowski
 Rosa Valetti

References

Bibliography
 Ian Aitken. European Film Theory and Cinema: A Critical Introduction. Indiana University Press, 2001.

External links

1921 films
Films of the Weimar Republic
German silent feature films
Films directed by Karlheinz Martin
Films shot at Johannisthal Studios
Lost German films
1920s science fiction films
German science fiction films
German black-and-white films
1920s German films
1920s German-language films
Silent science fiction films
Lost science fiction films